[PIAS] Cooperative, formerly Cooperative Music, often referred to as Co-Op, is a group of indie labels based in the UK but that have offices around the world, owned by [PIAS].

Through their partner labels [PIAS] Cooperative work with artists such as iamamiwhoami, Phoenix, Bloc Party, The Knife, Fleet Foxes, Prinzhorn Dance School, Citizens!, Interpol, The Black Keys and Mumford & Sons.

History
In April 2005, Cooperative Music was set up by the V2 Music Group as a transnational marketing and distribution operation which licenses independent labels, as opposed to individual artist companies which is the standard industry practice, for release in Europe, Australia and Japan. This in-house licensing division has an exclusive international marketing team with representation in the UK, Ireland, France, Germany, Italy, Spain, Holland, Belgium, Sweden, Norway, Denmark, Australia and Japan.

In February 2013 [PIAS] acquired Co-Op from Universal Music Group.

In November 2022, Universal Music Group purchased 49% stake in [PIAS] (including [PIAS] Cooperative).

Partner labels

 37 Adventures
 Acid Jazz Records
 ATO Records
 Bella Union
 DFA Records
 Heavenly Recordings
 Mute Records
 Phantasy
 Point Of Departure
 Research
 Transgressive Records
 Wichita Recordings

References

External links
 
 

British independent record labels
Record labels established in 2005
Record label distributors